

434001–434100 

|-bgcolor=#f2f2f2
| colspan=4 align=center | 
|}

434101–434200 

|-bgcolor=#f2f2f2
| colspan=4 align=center | 
|}

434201–434300 

|-bgcolor=#f2f2f2
| colspan=4 align=center | 
|}

434301–434400 

|-bgcolor=#f2f2f2
| colspan=4 align=center | 
|}

434401–434500 

|-id=453
| 434453 Ayerdhal ||  || Yal Ayerdhal (1959–2015), a French novelist specializing in politically engaged science fiction. He authored over 20 novels and won several prestigious literary prizes. He was instrumental and inspirational raising modern French science fiction to its present literary level and was a champion of the rights of writers. || 
|}

434501–434600 

|-bgcolor=#f2f2f2
| colspan=4 align=center | 
|}

434601–434700 

|-bgcolor=#f2f2f2
| colspan=4 align=center | 
|}

434701–434800 

|-bgcolor=#f2f2f2
| colspan=4 align=center | 
|}

434801–434900 

|-bgcolor=#f2f2f2
| colspan=4 align=center | 
|}

434901–435000 

|-bgcolor=#f2f2f2
| colspan=4 align=center | 
|}

References 

434001-435000